Zapolice  is a village in Zduńska Wola County, Łódź Voivodeship, in central Poland. It is the seat of the gmina (administrative district) called Gmina Zapolice.

The village has a population of 730.

References

Villages in Zduńska Wola County